The Alliance for a New Ivory Coast (ANCI) is an Ivorian political party established as a splinter from the Rally of the Republicans on 6 July 2007 under the leadership of former prime minister Alassane Ouattara.

2007 establishments in Ivory Coast
Political parties established in 2007
Political parties in Ivory Coast